Jin-san (Jin No. 3) Dam is a gravity dam located in Toyama prefecture in Japan. The dam is used for power production. The catchment area of the dam is 2063 km2. The dam impounds about 26  ha of land when full and can store 1455 thousand cubic meters of water. The construction of the dam was started on 1953 and completed in 1954.

References

Dams in Toyama Prefecture
1954 establishments in Japan